Aylon Darwin Tavella  (born 7 April 1992), known simply as Aylon, is a Brazilian footballer who plays as a forward for Ituano.

Career
Born in Esteio, Rio Grande do Sul, Aylon began his career at Sport Club Internacional. He had his first senior call-up on 14 November 2013, remaining an unused substitute as they lost 2–1 at Clube Atlético Mineiro in the year's Campeonato Brasileiro Série A, and repeated the feat three days later in a 3–1 loss at Goiás Esporte Clube.

The following 18 January, he scored on his senior debut in a 2–0 home win over Esporte Clube São Luiz in the first game of the year's Campeonato Gaúcho. Eight days later, in the first minute of the game, he scored in a 2–1 win at Esporte Clube Passo Fundo. He totalled two goals in six games as Inter won the title.

On 25 May 2014, Aylon made his national league debut, replacing Valdívia for the final 12 minutes of a 3–1 home loss to Esporte Clube Cruzeiro; his only other appearance of the season was on 7 September, when he came on in added time at the end of a 3–2 loss to Figueirense FC at the Estádio Beira-Rio.

On 16 January 2015, Aylon was loaned to Paysandu Sport Club for the year. He made his debut for the team from Belém on 21 February, playing the full 90 minutes of a 2–0 home win over Santos Futebol Clube (AP) in the first round of the year's Copa Verde (3–1 aggregate). He scored his first goal for the team on 7 March in the next round, opening a 4–1 win over Nacional-AM at the Estadio Leonidas Sodre de Castro. Aylon also represented the Papão in the year's Série B, scoring four goals in 28 games, including two on 13 November in a 3–2 home win over Luverdense Esporte Clube.

Chapecoense signed Aylon for the 2019 season.

Honours
Internacional
Campeonato Gaúcho: 2014, 2016

Goiás
Campeonato Goiano: 2017

Chapecoense
Campeonato Catarinense: 2020
Campeonato Brasileiro Série B: 2020

CSA
Campeonato Alagoano: 2021

References

External links
 

1992 births
Living people
Sportspeople from Rio Grande do Sul
Brazilian footballers
Association football forwards
Campeonato Brasileiro Série A players
Campeonato Brasileiro Série B players
Sport Club São Paulo players
Sport Club Internacional players
Paysandu Sport Club players
Goiás Esporte Clube players
América Futebol Clube (MG) players
Associação Chapecoense de Futebol players
Atlético Clube Goianiense players
Centro Sportivo Alagoano players
Ituano FC players